The 1982 Eastern Kentucky Colonels football team was an American football team that represented Eastern Kentucky University as a member of the Ohio Valley Conference (OVC) during the 1982 NCAA Division I-AA football season. In their 19th season under head coach Roy Kidd, the Colonels compiled a perfect 13–0 record and defeated Delaware in the 1982 NCAA Division I-AA Football Championship Game.

Schedule

References

 

Eastern Kentucky
Eastern Kentucky Colonels football seasons
NCAA Division I Football Champions
College football undefeated seasons
Eastern Kentucky Colonels football
Ohio Valley Conference football champion seasons